Güdəyli is a village in the municipality of Kurd Eldarbeyli in the Ismailli District of Azerbaijan.

References

Populated places in Ismayilli District